Mohamed Izzadeen Mohamed Naufer (born 17 January 1981) is a Sri Lankan footballer, who plays either on the left wing or as a striker for Army SC and the Sri Lanka national football team. On 6 September 2013 Izzadeen scored 4 goals against Bhutan in the 2013 SAFF Championship. He has also played for Sri Lanka in the 2006 AFC Challenge Cup and 2010 AFC Challenge Cups.

He has scored 9 goals in his career for Sri Lanka at International level.

Honours

Individual
Nehru Cup Top Scorer: 2009

References

External links

Sri Lankan footballers
Sri Lanka international footballers
Ratnam SC players
1981 births
Living people
Sri Lankan Muslims

Association football forwards
Sri Lanka Football Premier League players